The second season of the Serbian reality talent show Prvi glas Srbije. More than 5000 people attended auditions with the same goal - to be the First Voice of Serbia! Contestants had gone through auditions, rehearsals, knock-out rounds, eliminations and only 24 of them went to the Battle Rounds.

Stages
 Audition (in front of 3 judges)
 Bootcamp 
 Knock-out duels
 Live Shows

Auditions

Battle Rounds 

The number of contestants was reduced to only 13. Initially, there was supposed to be 12 of them but the astonishing performance of Nevena and Mirna's "Hurt" amazed judges so they decided to let them both pass this round.

Live Shows 

Each week the contestants perform live. Based on the public vote, bottom two go to the "Knock-Out Duels" where they perform another song to show the judges why they should stay in competition. After that, all three judges decide together which one deserves to stay and which one is going to be eliminated.

TOP13 

Theme of the night - "This is me" - The task for the singers was to represent themselves to the public by choosing a song on their own.

"Knock-Out Duel"

TOP12 

Theme of the night - "Party Song", the contestants were to sing popular party songs.

"Knock-Out Duel"

TOP11 

Theme of the night - "Hometown", the contestants were to sing popular songs from their hometowns.

"Knock-Out Duel"

TOP10 

Theme of the night - "Dedicated Song", the contestants were to sing songs dedicated to someone, mostly to their family members

"Knock-Out Duel"

TOP9 

Theme of the night - "Sexy Song", the contestants were to sing in the company of sexy dancers.

"Knock-Out Duel"

TOP8 

Theme of the night - "End Of The World", the contestants were to sing about World ending.

"Knock-Out Duel"

TOP7 

Theme of the night - "Movie's Soundtrack", the contestants were to sing two songs, one from a Serbian movie and one from an American (English) movie.
This is the first live show when each contestant performed two songs.

"Knock-Out Duel"

TOP6 

Theme of the night - "Audience's Songs" 
Two weeks before this night, Prva Srpska Televizija made a poll on their official site, where the fans of the show were able to vote for a song they would like to see the contestants sing. One Serbian and one English song were picked for every contestant.

"Knock-Out Duel"

TOP5 

Theme of the night - "Hit Songs". In this live show, two contestants left the competition.

"Knock-Out Duel"

FINALE 

Finalists sing three songs. Audience votes for their favourite and contestant with the fewest votes is eliminated. After that judges decide who is the winner.

Chart

External links 
 Official site - Prva.rs

2012 Serbian television seasons
2013 Serbian television seasons